Krishnamurthy Rajagopalan Iyer (born 2 January 1967 in Bilaspur, Chhattisgarh) is an Indian cricketer who plays for Madhya Pradesh. He made his first-class debut in the 1991–92 Ranji Trophy. He is a right-handed wicket-keeper batsman.

References

External links
 

1967 births
Living people
Indian cricketers
Madhya Pradesh cricketers
People from Bilaspur, Chhattisgarh
Cricketers from Chhattisgarh
Wicket-keepers